Luiz Carlos de Souza Pinto Junior or just Luiz Carlos (born 31 August 1980) is a Brazilian professional football forward.

Luiz Carlos played for Danish Superliga side Viborg FF in 2007.
He currently plays for Brazilian Serie A side Internacional.

External links

 

1980 births
Living people
CR Vasco da Gama players
Viborg FF players
Danish Superliga players
Sport Club Internacional
Itumbiara Esporte Clube players
Ceará Sporting Club players
Associação Portuguesa de Desportos players
Brasiliense Futebol Clube players
Expatriate men's footballers in Denmark
Association football forwards
Footballers from Rio de Janeiro (city)
Brazilian footballers